Aleksey Orlovich (born 22 August 2002) is a Belarusian professional footballer who plays for Isloch Minsk Raion.

References

External links 
 
 

2002 births
Living people
Footballers from Minsk
Belarusian footballers
Association football defenders
FC Isloch Minsk Raion players
FC Ostrovets players
FC Arsenal Dzerzhinsk players